, provisionally known as , is a centaur roughly 30–60 km in diameter. It has a highly inclined orbit and a barycentric semi-major axis (average distance from the Sun) of ~353 AU.

 has a well determined orbit and has been assigned a minor planet number. Objects such  may be the origin of Halley-type comets.

It came to perihelion in February 2013 at a distance of 11 AU from the Sun (outside the orbit of Saturn). , it is 12 AU from the Sun.

It will not be 50 AU from the Sun until 2047. After leaving the planetary region of the Solar System,  will have a barycentric aphelion of 696 AU with an orbital period of 6640 years.

In a 10 million year integration of the orbit, the nominal (best-fit) orbit and both 3-sigma clones remain outside 8.3AU (qmin) from the Sun.

Notes

References

External links 
 Distant Minor Planets 248835 & 2009 MS9 – Remanzacco Observatory (15 August 2012)
 

418993
418993
Discoveries by Brett J. Gladman
Discoveries by John J. Kavelaars
Discoveries by Jean-Marc Petit
20090625